Mitchell Smith Setzer (born March 12, 1965) is a  Republican member of the North Carolina General Assembly representing the state's eighty-ninth House district, including constituents in Catawba county. Setzer was born in and resides in Catawba, North Carolina. A sales professional, and executive vice president of his family's company, Smith Setzer and Son, a pipe company based out of the town of Catawba, he is currently serving in the North Carolina State House.

Committee assignments

2021-2022 Session
Insurance (Chair)
Finance (Senior Chair)
Ethics (Vice Chair)
Energy and Public Utilities
Local Government
Health
UNC Board of Governors Nominations

2019-2020 Session
Insurance (Chair)
Finance (Senior Chair)
Ethics (Vice Chair)
Energy and Public Utilities
State and Local Government
Health

2017-2018 Session
Appropriations
Appropriations - Justice and Public Safety
Insurance (Chair)
Finance (Chair)
Ethics
Health
State and Local Government II
Banking
Judiciary IV

2015-2016 Session
Insurance (Chair)
Finance (Chair)
Ethics
Health
Local Government
Judiciary IV
Aging

2013-2014 Session
Finance (Vice Chair)
Ethics (Vice Chair)
Government
Banking
Commerce and Job Development

2011-2012 Session
Finance (Chair)
Insurance (Vice Chair)
Ethics
Government
Banking
Commerce and Job Development
Public Utilities

2009-2010 Session
Insurance
Ethics
Finance
Financial Institutions
Rules

Electoral history

2020

2018

2016

2014

2012

2010

2008

2006

2004

2002

2000

References

External links

|-

Living people
1965 births
People from Catawba, North Carolina
20th-century American politicians
21st-century American politicians
Republican Party members of the North Carolina House of Representatives